In Philippine cuisine, roscas or biscocho de roscas refers to a pastry cookie product from the province of Leyte, mainly from the towns of Barugo and Carigara, made from lard, anise, flour, sugar, butter and eggs. Roscas are initially shaped as crescents or penannular rings (hence the name—roscas is Spanish for "rings"). Each of the roscas is then cut in half before baking, resulting in two separate elbow-shaped cookies.

While some claim that this pasalubong pastry cookie traces its history to the Spanish era, others have indicated that roscas-making in Leyte was started in the town of Barugo by a returning migrant in the late 1960s whose success was replicated in the nearby town of Carigara and the far town of Calbayog in Samar province. What original dish the roscas derive from remains unspecified, however.

See also 
 Half-moon cookie
 Biscocho
 Rosquillo
 List of Philippine desserts

References

  

Philippine pastries
Bread dishes
Culture of Leyte (province)
Culture of Samar (province)
Philippine breads
Visayan cuisine